The Government of El Salvador is a presidential representative democratic republic. The seat of the central government is in San Salvador.

Executive branch

President of El Salvador

El Salvador elects its head of state, the President of El Salvador, directly through a fixed-date general election whose winner is decided by absolute majority. If an absolute majority is not achieved by any candidate in the first round of a presidential election, then a run-off election is conducted 30 days later between the two candidates who obtained the most votes in the first round. The presidential period is five years, and re-election is permitted for another 5 years.

Cabinet
The executive branch of the government of El Salvador consists of the following departments, each led by a minister:
Agriculture & Livestock
Economy
Learning (Capital)
Environment & Natural Resources
Finance
Foreign Relations
Government
Sports
Labor & Social Welfare 
Public  Security & Justice
Public Works
Tourism 
Attorney General

Military of El Salvador 

The Ministry of Defence of El Salvador commands the armed forces, consisting of the following branches:

 Army of El Salvador
 Navy of El Salvador
 Air Force of El Salvador

Legislative branch 

The Salvadoran legislature is a unicameral body. It is made up of 84 deputies, all of whom are elected by direct popular vote according to closed-list proportional representation to serve three-year terms and are eligible for immediate re-election. Of these, 64 are elected in 14 multi-seat constituencies, corresponding to the country's 14 departments, which return between 3 and 16 deputies each. The remaining 20 deputies are selected on the basis of a single national constituency.

Judicial branch of the government of El Salvador 

 Supreme Court of El Salvador

See also
Constitution of El Salvador
Politics of El Salvador
Elections in El Salvador
List of political parties in El Salvador

References